The 2010 season is Oriente Petrolero's 54th competitive season, 34th consecutive season in the Liga de Fútbol Profesional Boliviano, and 55th year in existence as a football club. To see more news about Oriente go to Oriente Petrolero Site Official.

First team squad
As of 25 November 2010.

Reserves Squad

As of 10 November.

Transfer

In

Pre-season

Season

Loaned out

Pre-season

Start formations

, 1–2  Clausura

Starting 11
These charts below depict the eleven players that started the most Oriente Petrolero games in the entire 2010 season in the most used starting formation (currently 4–4–2).

Top scorers
Includes all competitive matches. The list is sorted by shirt number when total goals are equal.

Last updated on 30 September

 Note that Pablos Salinas is currently on loan at Deportes Quindío and Marcelo Aguirre at Rosario Central, and Gilberto Palacios is not on the leaderboard, because he left the club and players who left the club.

Competitions

Overall
{|  class="wikitable"
|-
! Competition !! Started Round !! Current Position/Round !! Final Position/Round  !! First Match !! Last Match
|-
| Copa Aerosur & del Sur 2010 || Qualifying Round ||—  || Play-off Round ||5 Jan || 24 Jan
|-
| Cuadrangular Internacional del Peru || Group Stage || – || Winners||1 Feb  || 15 Feb
|-
| Apertura || Group Stage || 2nd (Winner's Group) || 2nd ||2 March || 9 Jun
|-
| Torneo Invierno || First Stage|| Final || Winners||16 Jun  || 21 Jul
|-
| Clausura || Group Stage || 2nd ||—  ||— ||
|-
| Copa Sudamericana ||First Stage ||Second Stage ||Second Stage || 24 Sep || 21 Sep
|-

Copa Aerosur

Play-off round

Cuadrangular Internacional Del Peru

Return to Bolivia

Torneo Apertura

Serie B

Results by round

Matches

Winner's Hexagonal

Results by round

Torneo Invierno

First stage

Quarterfinals

Semifinals

Finals

3rd Match

Torneo Clausura

Standings

Results by round

Copa Sudamericana

First stage

In the First Stage, 16 teams will play two-legged ties (one game at home and one game away) against another opponent. The winner of each tie advances to the Second Stage. Team #1 will play the second leg at home.

Second stage

References

2010
Oriente Petrolero